"Lost Without You" is a song by British singer-songwriter Freya Ridings. It was released as a digital download on 3 November 2017 via Ridings' record label Good Soldier Records as the second single from Ridings' upcoming eponymous debut album (2019). The song was produced by Ollie Green. The song was included as part of Ridings' debut EP, You Mean the World to Me, as the second single from the project.

After being featured in Love Island, the song became Ridings' first charting single in July 2018, when it debuted on the UK Singles Chart; eventually peaking at number nine in October 2018. The song was sent to Australian radio on 31 January 2020 as the follow-up single to "Castles". In July 2020, the track was certified double Platinum by the British Phonographic Industry in recognition of achieving 1.2 million chart sales in the UK.

The song was used at first in a Nokia Mobile Christmas advertisement, after featuring in the second episode (Whose side are you on?) of the sixth season of American drama TV show Power during former AUSA Angela Valdez's funeral. The song was also featured in Season 15 Episode 19 of Grey's Anatomy, and an episode of Love, Victor. Kodi Lee covered the song in the last round of competition in the 2019 season of America's Got Talent, after which he was crowned the season's winner.

Charts

Weekly charts

Year-end charts

Certifications

Release history

References

2017 songs
2017 singles
2010s ballads
Freya Ridings songs
Capitol Records singles
Song recordings produced by Ollie Green
Songs written by Ollie Green (record producer)